The Night Brings Charlie is a 1990 American slasher film directed by Tom Logan, and written by Bruce Carson. A sequel, to be written and directed by Bruce Carson, was announced in 2017.

Plot 
In the small town of Pakoe, Shannon Davis is beheaded by a man wearing swimming goggles and a burlap sack. Investigating this homicide and a previous one are new sheriff Carl Carson, and mortician Walt Parker. As the bodycount rises and the killer begins taunting the police, suspicion falls on Charlie Puckett, a disfigured gardener who wears a mask similar to the serial killer's.

Charlie is brought in for questioning, but he refuses to talk, so Carson requests help from Walt, who had served alongside Charlie in the Vietnam War. Walt gets Charlie to confess, but Carson has doubts about his guilt, so he sets a trap which flushes out the real killer - Walt. Carson explains that he had looked into Walt's history, and discovered that he had dismembered a civilian in Vietnam, though the charges were dropped. When Carson mentions that Charlie was released from custody, Walt panics, and reveals that Charlie is just like him; Charlie helped him kill the Vietnamese girl, and is the one who murdered all of the Pakoe victims after Shannon Davis.

Carson leaves to look for Charlie, while the detained Walt is allowed to call home. Walt's daughter Tanya informs him that Jenny, his stepdaughter, has left to explore the abandoned barn that Charlie was living in. Fearing for Jenny's safety, Walt escapes custody. Charlie reaches the barn (after killing several people, and wounding Carson) and corners Jenny, who is saved by Tanya. As the sisters flee Charlie, they accidentally shoot their father with Carson's gun, though as a last act Walt saves his daughters by setting Charlie on fire.

The next day, Carson and his men scour the lake that Charlie ran into, but the search is called off by the district attorney, who prematurely closes the case, content with stating that Walt was responsible for all of the murders. As the sheriff laments that it is not over, Charlie is shown picking up a female hitchhiker on the outskirts of town.

Cast 
 Chuck Whiting as Charlie Puckett
 Kerry Knight as Sheriff Carl Carson
 Joe Fishback as Walt Parker
 Aimee Tenalia as Jenny Parker
 Monica Simmons as Tanya Parker
 David Carr as Deputy Jack
 Al Arasim as Eddie
 Robin Krasny as Debbie Del Vecchio
 Dina Lynn Gross as Katie
 Jim O'Donnell as Bobby Snyder

Release
The film was released on VHS in 1990. As of 2020, the film has not been released on DVD or Blu-ray.

Critical response

Justin Kerswell of Hysteria Lives! rated the film a score of two out of five, writing, "Sadly, despite some good cheesy touches it's overall a trifle dull (a cardinal sin for any slasher flick, I'm sure you'll agree). Not a really bad film by any means but, despite its rareness, ultimately it's not one that you really need to hunt down."

Sequel
On January 27, 2017, the film's original writer, Bruce Carson announced that he would be directing a sequel to the film. As of 2020, no new updates have been given.

References

External links 
 
 
 

American slasher films
American direct-to-video films
1990s teen horror films
1990 horror films
1990 films
American serial killer films
Films about siblings
Films shot in Florida
Mass murder in fiction
Films set in California
1990 direct-to-video films
American independent films
American teen horror films
Films about police officers
Direct-to-video horror films
Abandoned buildings and structures in fiction
American police films
1990s police procedural films
1990s English-language films
1990s American films